Aureimonas rubiginis is a bacterium from the genus of Aurantimonas which was isolated from a rusty iron plate.

References

External links
Type strain of Aureimonas rubiginis at BacDive -  the Bacterial Diversity Metadatabase

 

Hyphomicrobiales
Bacteria described in 2013